George Hedford Dunn (November 15, 1794 – January 12, 1854) was an American lawyer and politician who served one term as a U.S. Representative from Indiana from 1837 to 1839.

Biography 
He was born in New York City and moved to Lawrenceburg, Indiana, in 1817 to study law.
He was admitted to the bar in 1822 and commenced practice in Lawrenceburg, serving as member of the State house of representatives in 1828, 1832, and 1833. He was a promoter of the first railway in Indiana and was an unsuccessful candidate for election to the Twenty-fourth Congress.

Congress 
From March 4, 1837, to March 3, 1839, Dunn served on the Twenty-fifth Congress, but was an unsuccessful candidate for reelection.

Later career 
He resumed the practice of law and later became state treasurer from 1841 to 1844. He also served as judge of Dearborn County, Indiana, and was president of the Cincinnati & Indianapolis Railroad at the time of his death.

Death
He died in Lawrenceburg, Indiana, on January 12, 1854. He was interred in New Town Cemetery.

References

1794 births
1854 deaths
State treasurers of Indiana
Whig Party members of the United States House of Representatives from Indiana
19th-century American politicians
People from Lawrenceburg, Indiana